Louise Elizabeth Goddard (born 20 January 1950) professionally known as Liza Goddard, is an English television and stage actress, best known for her work in the 1970s and 1980s.

Early life
Goddard was born in Smethwick, Staffordshire. She is the daughter of David Goddard (1925–1992), who produced and directed numerous TV shows and programmes. She attended Farnham Girls' Grammar School, before her father moved the family to Australia, when she was 15, upon his appointment as Head of Drama at the Australian Broadcasting Corporation.

Career
Goddard made early television appearances in Australia, including episode 100 of Homicide ("The Traveller", 1966), and the ABC drama play Romanoff & Juliet (1967), and a brief (non-speaking, uncredited) appearance in the feature film They're A Weird Mob (1966). However, she is best remembered in Australia for her role as Clarissa "Clancy" Merrick in Skippy the Bush Kangaroo, in which she appeared in the first two series and 48 episodes.

After returning to the UK in 1969 as an adult, she was cast as Victoria Edgecombe, the character created by Terence Brady and Charlotte Bingham in Take Three Girls (1969), later appearing in its sequel Take Three Women (1982). She also had a supporting role in the 1972 comedy film Ooh… You Are Awful, starring Dick Emery. Her career breakthrough was as April in The Brothers (1972–76), which also featured her first husband, Colin Baker. She also appeared as Jocelyn in "National Pelmet", the Series 2 opener of the highly successful ITV drama Minder.

A comedy role alongside Donal Donnelly in Yes, Honestly (1976–77), by Terence Brady and Charlotte Bingham followed, as did a role with Christopher Biggins in a BBC1 sitcom Watch This Space (1980), by Ronald Chesney and Ronald Wolfe. This was followed by Pig in the Middle (1980–83) also written by Terence Brady and Charlotte Bingham.

Goddard was one of the 'explorers' who were 'evaporated' in a (now missing) episode of the BBC science fiction quiz programme The Adventure Game (1980), played a space pirate in the Doctor Who story Terminus (1983), and appeared in Roll Over Beethoven (1985), opposite Nigel Planer. She played Barbara Colport in the Tales of the Unexpected (TV series) episode (9/6) "Wink Three Times" (1988). She also played a humanist in the 1988 biographical film Testimony, starring Ben Kingsley. She then appeared in Woof!, a Children's ITV programme first broadcast in 1989. Her third husband, producer and director David Cobham, created this series. She had earlier appeared in the TV adaptation of Brendon Chase, also produced and directed by Cobham.

For many years, she was also the female team leader on the long-running quiz/panel show Give Us A Clue, replacing Una Stubbs in the role.

She was the subject of This Is Your Life in 1984 when she was surprised by Eamonn Andrews at the Ambassador's Theatre in London.

Goddard appeared as Laurel Manasotti in the ITV sitcom That's Love.

She later had a recurring role as Philippa Vale in Bergerac (featuring in four series between 1984 and 1989) and alongside Dawn French and Catherine Tate in Wild West (2002). In 2007 she appeared in the Midsomer Murders episode "A Picture of Innocence", reuniting her with Bergerac star John Nettles. In 2012 she had a cameo role in the all-star comedy film Run for Your Wife, and in 2013 she toured with the official Agatha Christie Theatre Company in Go Back for Murder, an adaptation of the book Five Little Pigs.

In September 2016, Goddard played the guest role of Gloria Francis in the BBC1 drama series Casualty.

Personal life
Goddard's first marriage was to future Doctor Who actor Colin Baker. She also dated former Doctor Who companion Frazer Hines (who later appeared with Baker in the story "The Two Doctors"). Prior to marrying Baker, she had a son, Thom, from another relationship.

In 1981 she married pop star Alvin Stardust. Goddard's daughter from her marriage with Stardust, Sophie Jewry, was critically injured at the age of two months after she fell down a set of stairs and suffered a severe fracture of the skull. She later recovered from her injuries.

Goddard's third marriage was to producer and director David Cobham.

She lives near Dereham, Norfolk and also works with the RSPCA, amongst other charities. She suffered, and recovered from, breast cancer in 1997.

References

External links

1950 births
Living people
British stage actresses
British television actresses
People from Smethwick